The St. Louis University Men's Soccer Half-Century Team was announced September 30, 2009 by the St. Louis University Department of Athletics in celebration of the first 50 years of soccer at SLU. Two coaches, two goalkeepers, eight defensemen, and twelve offensive players were selected by fan balloting.

Members
Name (Years at SLU)

Coaches
Bob Guelker (1959–66)
Harry Keough (1967–82)

Goalkeepers
Kevin Johnston (1987–90)
Chuck Zorumski (1972–73)

Defense
Don Ceresia (1962–64)
Joe Clarke (1972–75)
Mark Demling (1970–73)
Bruce Hudson (1971–74)
Kevin Kalish (1997–98)
Bob Matteson (1970–73)
Bill McKeon (1979–82)
Denny Werner (1970–73)

Offense
Brad Davis (2000–01)
Dan Counce (1970–73)
Carl Gentile (1963–65)
John Hayes (1978–81)
Jack Jewsbury (1999–2002)
Ty Keough (1975–78)
Brian McBride (1990–93)
Pat McBride (1963–65)
Matt McKeon (1992–95)
Mike Seerey (1969–72)
Mike Sorber (1989–92)
Al Trost (1968–70)

External links
  SLU Unveils Billiken Half-Century Team

Saint Louis Billikens men's soccer